Muenge Kafuanka (born 7 July 1961) is a Congolese boxer. He competed in the men's light welterweight event at the 1984 Summer Olympics.

References

1961 births
Living people
Democratic Republic of the Congo male boxers
Olympic boxers of the Democratic Republic of the Congo
Boxers at the 1984 Summer Olympics
Place of birth missing (living people)
Light-welterweight boxers